Borough 2 is a borough of Düsseldorf, the state capital of North Rhine-Westphalia, Germany. The borough covers an area of 7.15 square kilometres and (as of December 2020) has about 64,000 inhabitants.

Borough 2 is the smallest of all boroughs in Düsseldorf and next to the central city borough 1, it is the only of Düsseldorf's boroughs to not touch the city limits. Starting clockwise from North-west to South-west, Borough 2 borders with the following Düsseldorf boroughs: 1, 6, 7, 8 and 3.

Subdivisions 
Borough 2 is made up of three Stadtteile (city parts):

Places of interest

Arts, Culture and Entertainment 
 Eisstadion, Düsseltal

Landmarks 
 Pauluskirche, Düsseltal

Parks and open spaces 
 Zoopark

Transportation 
The borough is served by numerous railway stations and highway. Stations include Düsseldorf Zoo, Düsseldorf Flingern and a dense net of both Düsseldorf Stadtbahn underground- and Rheinbahn tram-stations. The borough can also be reached via Bundesautobahn 57 and Bundesstraße 7 and 8.

See also 
 Boroughs of Düsseldorf

References

External links 
 Official webpage of the borough 

!